Emil Nazim ogly Balayev (born 17 April 1994) is a professional footballer who plays as a goalkeeper for Sabail. Born in Russia, he represents the Azerbaijan national team. He was selected as the footballer of the year in Azerbaijan in 2019.

Club career
As a youth player Balayev was a member of Neftçi youth system, before he was promoted to the first team in 2011. Balayev made his debut for Neftchi in an Azerbaijan Premier League match against Sumgayit in September 2012. In 2013 Balayev was sent on a season loan to Araz-Naxçıvan.

Balayev moved from Neftçi to Bundesliga club Eintracht Frankfurt in January 2014. However, he failed to make an appearance for the club and was released in June 2016.

In January 2019, Balayev moved from Sabail to Kazakhstani club Tobol. He made his professional debut for Tobol in the Kazakhstan Premier League on 9 March 2019, starting in the home match against Irtysh Pavlodar, which finished as a 3–0 win. On 31 January 2020, Balayev left Tobol by mutual consent.

On 3 March 2020, Zira announced the signing of Balayev on a contract until the end of the 2019–20 season.

On 10 July 2020, Balayev signed a contract with Qarabağ FK. On 3 March 2022, Balayev left Qarabağ.

On 4 March 2022, Kazakhstan Premier League club Turan announced the signing of Balayev. Balayev left Turan in June 2022.

International career
Balayev was called up to the Azerbaijan national team for the first time in September 2013 for a 2014 FIFA World Cup qualification match against Israel. He made his International debut in a Euro 2020 qualifier against Croatia on 9 September 2019.

Balayev was included in the squad of hosts Azerbaijan's under-23 team at the 2017 Islamic Solidarity Games in Baku, in which Azerbaijan went on to win the gold medal.

Balayev made his Azerbaijan debut in 2019 against Croatia in UEFA Euro 2020 qualifying.

Career statistics

International

Statistics accurate as of match played 19 November 2019

Honours

Club
 Neftchi Baku
Azerbaijan Premier League: (1) 2012–13
Azerbaijan Cup: (1) 2012–13

 Araz-Naxçıvan 
Azerbaijan First Division: (1) 2013–14

International
Azerbaijan U23
 Islamic Solidarity Games: (1) 2017

Individual
Azerbaijani Footballer of the Year (1): 2019

References

External links
 
 
 

1994 births
Living people
Sportspeople from Volgograd
Citizens of Azerbaijan through descent
Azerbaijani footballers
Azerbaijan international footballers
Russian footballers
Russian sportspeople of Azerbaijani descent
Association football goalkeepers
Azerbaijani expatriate footballers
Azerbaijani expatriate sportspeople in Germany
Expatriate footballers in Germany
Azerbaijani expatriate sportspeople in Kazakhstan
Expatriate footballers in Kazakhstan
Neftçi PFK players
Sumgayit FK players
Araz-Naxçıvan PFK players
Eintracht Frankfurt players
Qarabağ FK players
Sabail FK players
FC Tobol players
Azerbaijan Premier League players
Kazakhstan Premier League players